Jaromír Musil (born 28 May 1988 in Prague) is a Czech judoka. He competed in the men's 81 kg event at the 2012 Summer Olympics and was eliminated in the second round by Sergiu Toma.

References

External links
 
 

1988 births
Living people
Czech male judoka
Olympic judoka of the Czech Republic
Judoka at the 2012 Summer Olympics
Sportspeople from Prague
European Games competitors for the Czech Republic
Judoka at the 2015 European Games
Judoka at the 2019 European Games